

Higher Education Degrees

Professional Licenses, Certificates, and Qualifications

Notes

References

Post
Hong
Post-nominal letters